Randy Gordon may refer to:
 Randy Gordon (politician), member of the Washington Senate
 Randy Gordon (boxing), American boxing journalist, commentator, and administrator